Mashkan (also Romanized as Māshkān and Mashkān; also known as Māshgān and Mashkiān) is a village in Lahijan-e Gharbi Rural District, Lajan District, Piranshahr County, West Azerbaijan Province, Iran. At the 2006 census, its population was 305, in 45 families.

References 

Populated places in Piranshahr County